John Thomas Thornton Shreeve (18 August 1917 – 30 July 1966) was an English professional footballer who played as a left back.

Career
After playing non-league football with Boldon Villa, Shreeve made 145 appearances in the Football League for Charlton Athletic.

References

1917 births
1966 deaths
English footballers
Charlton Athletic F.C. players
English Football League players
Association football fullbacks
FA Cup Final players